The women's 400 metre freestyle event at the 1952 Olympic Games took place between 31 July and 2 August at the Swimming Stadium. This swimming event used freestyle swimming, which means that the method of the stroke is not regulated (unlike backstroke, breaststroke, and butterfly events). Nearly all swimmers use the front crawl or a variant of that stroke. Because an Olympic size swimming pool is 50 metres long, this race consisted of sixteen lengths of the pool.

Medalists

Results

Heats
Sixteen fastest swimmers advanced to semi-finals.

Heat 1

Heat 2

Heat 3

Heat 4

Heat 5

Semifinals
Eight fastest swimmers advanced to the finals.

Heat 1

Heat 2

Final

Key: OR = Olympic record

References

External links

Women's freestyle 400 metre
1952 in women's swimming
Women's events at the 1952 Summer Olympics